Joseph Edgard Montegut (1806–1880) was the 15th mayor of New Orleans, Louisiana, serving from May 13, 1844, to April 5, 1846.

Death
Montegut died in 1880 and has a grave at the St. Louis Cemetery.

References

Mayors of New Orleans
1806 births
1880 deaths
19th-century American politicians